Fallowfield station or Fallowfield Train Station is an inter-city passenger railway station and bus rapid transit station located at 3347 Fallowfield Road in the suburban neighbourhood of Barrhaven in Ottawa, Ontario, Canada.

Location

Fallowfield station is located on the north side of Fallowfield Road (Regional Road 12) just west of its intersection with Woodroffe Avenue. The main station entrance faces southeast towards a short access road (Via Park Place) which connects the station to Fallowfield Road. On the northwest side of the station, trains call at 1 low-level side platform and two tracks bordering on agricultural lands of the Ottawa Greenbelt. Small paid parking lots are located to either side of the station, while to the southeast lies an OC Transpo Transitway bus rapid transit station and a large commuter park and ride parking lot.  

The station is located southwest of downtown Ottawa on the edge of a low-density residential neighbourhood. The closest hotels are more than 5 kilometers to the northeast near Hunt Club Road and the Ottawa Macdonald–Cartier International Airport. South of the station, on the other side of Fallowfield Road, are various fast food franchises, including a McDonald's, Tim Hortons and a Gabriel Pizza location inside a small strip mall. Additional food options in the area are located more than a kilometer to the west on Fallowfield Road. 

Fallowfield station is located approximately 12 kilometers to the west of the Ottawa Macdonald–Cartier International Airport.

Railway services
Fallowfield is a stop for all Via Rail trains operating in Corridor service between Ottawa and Toronto, and it has also been the terminus for some trips between Ottawa and Montreal, extending that service beyond the primary Ottawa station.

As of June 2022, Fallowfield station is served by 1 domestic route (with connections) provided by Via Rail, the primary passenger rail operator in Canada. Trains for Montreal and Quebec City presently do not depart from Fallowfield and must be boarded at Ottawa station.

Ottawa - Kingston - Toronto

 No local service between Ottawa and Fallowfield, or Guildwood and Toronto.

Station services

The wheelchair accessible station is staffed and the building is equipped with a ticket office, waiting room, vending machines, washrooms and Wi-Fi internet access.

Transitway station

Southeast of the train station entrance is an OC Transpo Transitway bus stop (Fallowfield Transitway Station) offering frequent bus service to the west end of Ottawa and downtown.
 The following routes serve Fallowfield as of October 6, 2019:

Future plans
The City of Ottawa plans to extend the O-Train Confederation Line to Fallowfield station sometime after 2031.

Parking
1709 surface lot parking spaces are available in the OC Transpo park and ride lot south of the station, while the 107 paid parking spots on either side of the train station are managed by Indigo Parking. Hourly and monthly rates are available.

History
The 2013 Ottawa bus–train crash took place on September 18, 2013, between an OC Transpo bus and a Via train, at a level crossing located north of Fallowfield station. Six bus passengers died and several people were injured as a result.

References

External links

Via Rail temporary train schedule with changes due to Covid 19 (Effective 31 March 2020)
OC Transpo bus station page

Via Rail stations in Ontario
2000 establishments in Ontario
2002 establishments in Ontario
Railway stations in Canada opened in 2002
Railway stations in Ottawa
Transitway (Ottawa) stations
Transport in Ottawa